The 2011 Real Salt Lake season was the club's seventh year of existence, as well as their seventh season in Major League Soccer, and their seventh consecutive season in the top-flight of American soccer.

Salt Lake's season was highlighted by reaching the 2011 CONCACAF Champions League Finals, becoming the first American soccer club to reach the final of the newly designed CONCACAF Champions League, as well as the first non-Mexican club to reach the finals. Including the predecessor tournament, the Champions' Cup, it was the first time in 11 years an American club reached the North American club final, the last being Los Angeles Galaxy. Additionally, Salt Lake finished third place in both the Western Conference and overall MLS tables during the regular season, thus earning a berth into the 2012–13 CONCACAF Champions League. In the 2011 MLS Cup Playoffs, Salt Lake reached the Western Conference Final, but fell to eventual MLS Cup champions, Los Angeles Galaxy. Salt Lake also reached the quarterfinals of the 2011 U.S. Open Cup before falling to eventual semifinalists, FC Dallas.

Background

Review

November
Towards the end of November 2010, Major League Soccer held its Expansion Draft for the arrivals of Portland Timbers and Vancouver Whitecaps FC. Among Salt Lake's unprotected players for the draft, Portland selected two: Robbie Findley and David Horst. Findley, though, following an expired contract with the Royals, declared his intentions to play overseas, with rumors circulating about him possibly playing for Danish Superliga clubs Brøndby and Randers, Premier League club Wolverhampton, even Championship club Nottingham Forest. On November 24, Randers denied rumors that Findley was on trial with the club.

Subsequent to the expansion draft, the Royals made a trade with the Timbers to bring in Salvadorian Arturo Alvarez, whom previously played his club soccer for San Jose Earthquakes, in return for allocation money and draft picks.

December
After much anticipation, Salt Lake agreed to buy striker Alvaro Saborio on loan from the Swiss club Sion on December 1, for a fee of around $1.0M.  Saborío, spent the 2010 season on loan with the Royals where he scored 12 league goals and bagged six Champions League goals. He will sign as a Designated Player being the first in club history.

After much rumor as to where striker Robbie Findley would end up, he eventually signed for English Championship club Nottingham Forest, making Findley the first RSL player to leave for Europe since Yura Movsisyan went to Randers. Findley signed with Forest on December 23. The contract was reported to be for 2.5 years through the end of the 2012-13 English football season.

January
The club met in late January to begin preparations for the first leg of the Champions League quarterfinal vs. Columbus on February 22.

February
Salt Lake spent the month of February in preparations for their Champions League semifinal. Prior to the match, they played two final tune up games against Vancouver Whitecaps FC and Chivas USA.

In their quarterfinal away fixture, in the frigid cold, 25 degrees, RSL drew Columbus 0-0.

March

April 

Salt Lake opened April with a semifinal fixture on the road to Saprissa. The match, played on April 5, ended in a 2–1 victory for Saprissa, although Salt Lake would win 3–2 on aggregate, secured by Jamison Olave's half volley in the 71st minute of play.

The win booked Salt Lake a spot in the Champions League finals, in which they became the first American team to make the finals under the current format, as well as the first American team to make the finals of a CONCACAF club tournament since Los Angeles Galaxy in 2000. On April 6, it was learned that Salt Lake would be playing Monterrey of Mexico in the Champions League finals, after Monterrey pulled off a 2–1 aggregate win over Cruz Azul.

On April 9, the club would return to league play, flying out to Boston to take on New England Revolution. Because of the Champions League match three days earlier, many first team players rested this weekend and mainly a team composed of reserves and a few starters played in the game. In spite of this, Salt Lake was able to pull off a 2–0 win at New England, giving them a perfect 3-0-0 record.

Following the New England match, the club had another mid-week fixture against Rocky Mountain rivals, Colorado Rapids. Due to the club's recent success in 2011, the match was expected to be hotly contested. A crowd of nearly 15,500 showed up for the mid-week game as Salt Lake pulled off a controversial, late goal in injury time. The goal was scored by Fabián Espíndola.

Originally, Salt Lake was to host Philadelphia Union on April 23, but the Union voluntarily rescheduled their match to September 3. The Union rescheduled the match to help aid Salt Lake in their Champions League campaign.

On April 20, Salt Lake resumed Champions League play with the first leg of the 2011 CONCACAF Champions League Finals being held at Monterrey's Technology Stadium. Salt Lake found themselves trailing within the first 20 minutes of play, following a defensive mishap that led to a loose ball tapped in by Aldo de Nigris. The Claret and Cobalt would draw level in the 35th minute of play, thanks to a header off of Nat Borchers from a Javier Morales set piece, leading to a 1-1 scoreline at halftime. In the second half of play, a 62nd minute handball from Salt Lake defender Jamison Olave consequently led to a penalty kick for Los Rayados. Chilean international Humberto Suazo converted the penalty, regaining the lead for Monterrey, 2–1. In the dying minutes of the match, Salt Lake midfielder, Morales, made two cutbacks over Monterrey defenders Sergio Pérez and Neri Cardozo to score the equalizer, leading to a final scoreline of 2-2.

The draw against Monterrey resulted in only the fourth time in history that an American soccer club had tied a Mexican opponent on Mexican soil.  The previous time was when D.C. United tied Toluca 1–1 in the 2009–10 edition of the Champions League. The result brings American club performance in Mexico to (0-21-4) and MLS club performance in Mexico to (0-23-6). Salt Lake will host Monterrey in the second leg of the finals on April 27 at Rio Tinto Stadium.

Match results

Preseason 

Note: Results are given with Real Salt Lake's score listed first.

Major League Soccer

Regular season

Playoffs

CONCACAF Champions League

U.S. Open Cup

Major League Soccer

League tables

Western Conference table

Overall table

Results summary

Club

Roster

MLS roster 
As of September 15, 2011.

CONCACAF Champions League roster 

As of February 22, 2011.

Staff

Coaching staff

Disciplinary record 

Last updated on March 2, 2011

Player movement

Transfers

In

Out

Loan

In

Out

Competitions

Miscellany

Allocation Ranking 
Real Salt Lake is in the #8 position in the MLS Allocation Ranking. The allocation ranking is the mechanism used to determine which MLS club has first priority to acquire a U.S. National Team player who signs with MLS after playing abroad, or a former MLS player who returns to the league after having gone to a club abroad for a transfer fee. A ranking can be traded, provided that part of the compensation received in return is another club's ranking.

International Roster Spots 
Real Salt Lake possesses 6 international roster spots. Each club in Major League Soccer is allocated 8 international roster spots, which can be traded. The club dealt one spot permanently to Colorado Rapids on 29 June 2005 and dealt another spot permanently to Chivas USA on 24 November 2004. The club also dealt a spot to Kansas City on 23 February 2010 but use of that roster spot was for the 2010 season only.

There is no limit on the number of international slots on each club's roster. The remaining roster slots must belong to domestic players. For clubs based in the United States, a domestic player is either a U.S. citizen, a permanent resident (green card holder) or the holder of other special status (e.g., refugee or asylum status).

Future Draft Pick Trades 
Future picks acquired: 2012 SuperDraft conditional pick acquired from Chivas USA.
Future picks traded: None.

MLS Rights to Other Players 
Real Salt Lake maintains the MLS rights to Yura Movsisyan after the player declined a contract offer by the club and signed overseas on a free transfer.

References

External links 

Real Salt Lake seasons
Real Salt Lake
Real Salt Lake
Real Salt Lake